Anastasia Le-Roy (born 11 September 1987) is a Jamaican track and field athlete, who specializes in the 400 metres. Le-Roy, in recent times has positioned herself as a key member of Jamaica's 4 x 400 metres women team and helped them in setting a games' record of 3 minutes 23.82 seconds (3:23.82) at the 2014 Commonwealth Games.

Personal bests

All information taken from IAAF profile.

Competition record

1: Competed only in the heat.
2: Disqualified in the final

References

External links

Living people
1987 births
People from Manchester Parish
Jamaican female sprinters
Athletes (track and field) at the 2014 Commonwealth Games
Athletes (track and field) at the 2018 Commonwealth Games
Athletes (track and field) at the 2015 Pan American Games
Athletes (track and field) at the 2019 Pan American Games
World Athletics Championships athletes for Jamaica
World Athletics Championships medalists
Commonwealth Games gold medallists for Jamaica
Commonwealth Games medallists in athletics
Pan American Games medalists in athletics (track and field)
Pan American Games silver medalists for Jamaica
Universiade medalists in athletics (track and field)
Central American and Caribbean Games silver medalists for Jamaica
Competitors at the 2010 Central American and Caribbean Games
Universiade bronze medalists for Jamaica
World Athletics Championships winners
Central American and Caribbean Games medalists in athletics
Medalists at the 2011 Summer Universiade
Medalists at the 2013 Summer Universiade
Medalists at the 2015 Pan American Games
20th-century Jamaican women
21st-century Jamaican women
Medallists at the 2018 Commonwealth Games